

Gallery

List of Works

A
Acrobatie érotique
Acteurs et audience dans le théâtre
Apollinaire, l'artilleur
Arlequin
Arlequin à la guitare (2)
Arlequin à la guitare (Si tu veux)
Arlequin à la guitare, Avignon
Arlequin assis à la guitare
Arlequin jouant de la guitare
Arlequin tenant une bouteille et femme
Arlésienne
Autoportrait (2)

B

Balcon avec vue sur mer
Bec à gaz et guitare
Boite peinte
Bouteille d'anis Del Mono et compotier avec raisins
Bouteille de Bass et guitare
Bouteille de Bass, clarinette, guitare, violon, journal, as de trèfle
Bouteille de Bass, guitare, as de trèfle
Bouteille de Bass, verre et journal
Bouteille de Bass, verre, paquet de tabac, carte de visite
Bouteille de Malaga
Bouteille de Pernod et verre
Bouteille de porto et verre
Bouteille de Vieux Marc, verre et journal
Bouteille et verre
Bouteille et verre sur un guéridon
Bouteille sur une table
Bouteille, clarinette, violon, journal, verre
Bouteille, guitare, pipe
Bouteille, tasse, journal
Bouteille, verre et compotier sur une table
Bouteille, verre et journal sur une table
Bouteille, verre et pipe
Bouteille, verre et violon
Bouteille, verre, fourchette
Bouteille, verre, journal
Buffalo Bill
Buste de femme

C
Cantatrice
Cartes à jouer, bouteille, verre
Cartes à jouer, verres, bouteille de rhum ('Vive la France')
Cinq baigneuses (Baigneuses regardant un avion)
Composition
Composition à la guitare
Composition au violon
Composition géométrique
Compotier
Compotier avec fruits, mandoline, verre sur une table dans un paysage
Compotier avec fruits, violon et verre
Compotier avec poire et pomme
Compotier avec raisins sur une table devant une fenêtre
Compotier et poire coupée
Compotier sur une table
Compotier sur une table devant une fenêtre
Compotier, grappe de raisin, poire coupée
Compotier, verre, bouteille, fruits (Nature morte verte)
Corbeille de fruits
Couple
Couple de danseurs
Couteau, fourchette, menu, bouteille, jambon
Crane et pichet

D
Danseuse
Danseuse assise (Olga Picasso)
Danseuses, d'après une photographie
Deux baigneuses
Deux baigneuses assises
Deux femmes
Deux femmes nues
Deux nus allongés

E
Elements d'étude
Études
Etudiant au journal

F
Femme à la guitare
Femme à la guitare assise
Femme à la guitare près d'un piano
Femme allongée
Femme assise
Femme assise à la guitare
Femme assise à la mandoline
Femme assise accoudée
Femme assise au chapeau
Femme assise avec livre
Femme assise dans un fauteuil (5)
Femme assise dans un fauteuil rouge
Femme assise dans un fauteuil (Eva)
Femme au chapeau à plumes
Femme au chapeau dans un fauteuil
Femme au chapeau de velours dans un fauteuil et colombes
Femme couchée au bord de mer
Femme dans un fauteuil
Femme debout
Femme debout accoudée (Olga)
Femme en chemise assise dans un fauteuil
Femme en chemise dans un fauteuil
Femme en chemise dans un fauteuil [Étude]
Femme en costume espagnol (La Salchichona)
Femme et soldat Étude
Femme lisant (Olga)
Femme lisant (Olga)
Femme nue ('J'aime Eva')
Femme nue (6)
Femme nue assise dans un fauteuil
Femme nue dans un fauteuil et homme à la moustache
Femme-Guitare
Fenêtre ouverte sur la rue de Penthieure
Fêtes de Céret
Fillette au cerceau

G
Grappe de raisin
Grappe de raisins, pipe, verre et journal
Grenade, verre, pipe
Guéridon avec guitare
Guéridon avec guitare et partition
Guéridon et guitare
Guéridon, verres, tasses, mandoline
Guitare
Guitare 'J'aime Eva
Guitare (1)
Guitare (2)
Guitare (3)
Guitare et bouteille de Bass
Guitare et bouteille de Bass [Étude]
Guitare et compotier
Guitare et compotier sur une table carrée
Guitare et cruche sur une table
Guitare et feuille de musique
Guitare et partition sur un guéridon
Guitare et tasse à café
Guitare sur un guéridon
Guitare sur une table
Guitare sur une table II
Guitare verte et rose
Guitare verte qui étend
Guitare, bouteille et verre sur une table ronde
Guitare, carte à jouer, verre, journal
Guitare, clarinette et bouteille sur une table
Guitare, crâne et journal
Guitare, journal, verre et bouteille
Guitare, partition, verre
Guitare, verre et journal
Guitare, verre et pipe
Guitare, verre, bouteille de vieux marc
Guitariste
Guitariste (La mandoliniste)
Guitariste avec partition
Guitariste dans un fauteuil

H
Homme
Homme à chapeau
Homme à la clarinette
Homme à la guitare
Homme à la guitare et femme
Homme à la mandoline (2)
Homme à la pipe
Homme à la pipe (Le fumeur)
Homme à la tenora avec livre
Homme accoudé sur une table
Homme assis
Homme assis accoudé
Homme assis dans un fauteuil
Homme au chapeau
Homme au chapeau à la pipe
Homme au chapeau accoudé sur une table
Homme au chapeau jouant de la guitare
Homme au chapeau melon assis dans un fauteuil
Homme au chapeau tenant une guitare
Homme au chapeau tenant une guitare
Homme aux mains croisées accoudé à une table
Homme avec guitare
Homme lisant un journal
Homme-Manteau (Homme à la cheminée)

I
Instruments de musique
Instruments de musique et compotier sur un guéridon
Instruments de musique et compotier sur une table
Instruments de musique et tête de mort
Instruments de musique sur une table
Instruments et bol de fruits devant une fenêtre avec un avion

J
Jambon, verre, bouteille de vieux marc, journal
Jeune fille au chapeau les mains croisées
Joueur de cartes

L
L'arlequin de Barcelone
L'artiste et son modèle
L'atelier de l'artiste rue de La Boétie
L'Avenue Frochot, vu de l'atelier de Picasso
L'écolière
L'Égyptien
L'enlèvement
L'étagère
L'étudiant a la pipe
L'éventail (L'Indépendant)
L'Homme aux cartes
L'italienne
La clarinette
La coquille Saint-Jacques ('Notre Avenir est dans l'air')
La crucifixion
La Femme au Violon
La grenade
La guitare
La mandoliniste
La mandoliniste assise
La pointe de la Cité
La Rue d'Orchampt
La sieste
La table
La table de l'architecte
La table devant la fenêtre
Le bouteille de Rhum
Le guéridon
Le journal
Le ménage Sisley d'apres 'Les Fiancés' d'Auguste Renoir
Le pigeon
Le pigeon aux petits pois
Le poète (The Poet), (1911, Guggenhein), (1912, Kunstmuseum Basel)
Le Pont-Neuf
Le rapt (Nessus & Déjanire)
Le retour du baptême (Le Nain)
Le verre
Le verre d'absinthe
Les amoureux
Les baigneuses
Les boxeurs
Les communiants
Les échecs
Les oiseaux morts

M
Ma Jolie Mural
Ma Jolie|Ma Jolie (Femme à la guitare)
Main
Mandoline et clarinette

N
Nature morte
Nature morte à l'oiseau mort
Nature morte à la bouteille et à la guitare
Nature morte à la colombe (Oiseau sur une table)
Nature morte à la guitare
Nature morte à la guitare et Pulcinella
Nature morte au guéridon
Nature morte au guéridon et à l'assiette
Nature morte au pichet et aux pommes
Nature morte au verre
Nature morte aux bouteille 'Vie de Marc'''Nature morte aux fleurs de lisNature morte avec bouteille et verreNature morte devant une fenêtreNature morte devant une fenêtre à Saint-RaphaëlNature morte espagnoleNature morte sur un piano ('CORT')Notre Avenir est dans l'AirNu deboutNu debout de profilNu debout se regardant dans un miroirOOiseau sur une brancheOlgaOlga au chapeau à plumesOlga lisant assise dans un fauteuilPPalette, pinceaux, livre de Victor HugoParade (études pour le rideau de scène)Parade: Costume de manager américainParade: Costume de manager françaisPartition et guitarePaysage à l'arbre mort et vifPaysage aux affichesPaysage de CéretPaysage de Juan-les-PinsPersonage (5)Personage arlequinesque (Arlequin)Personage au compotierPierrotPierrot au loupPierrot et arlequinPierrot et arlequin à une terrasse de caféPipe et cartePipe et partitionPipe et verrePipe, bouteille de Bass, déPipe, dé, journalPipe, Glass, Bottle of Vieux MarcPipe, verre et paquet de tabacPipe, verre, as de trèfle, bouteille de Bass, guitare, dé ('Ma Jolie')Pipe, verre, boîte d'allumettesPipe, verre, bouteille de rhumPipe, verre, bouteille de Vieux Marc ('Lacerba')PommePort d'AntibesPortrait d' Erik SatiePortrait d'Igor StravinskyPortrait d'Olga (3)Portrait d'Olga à la mantillePortrait d'Olga dans un fauteuilPortrait d'un homme barbu accoudé à une sellettePortrait d'un jeune hommePortrait de Diaghilev & SeligsbergPortrait de femme (Olga)Portrait de Guillaume ApollinairePortrait de jeune fillePortrait de Léonide MassinePortrait de Madame Rosenberg et sa fillePortrait de Pierre-Auguste RenoirPoulet, bouteille et verreProjet pour le costume de PulcinellaProjet pour PulcinellaQQuatre baigneusesRRestaurantRideau pour le ballet ParadeSSept danseusesSept danseuses don't Olga Picasso au premier planSouvenir du HavreStill life with Chair Caning

TTenant une bouteille de vinTêteTête d'arlequinTête d'hommeTête d'homme au chapeauTête d'homme moustachuTête d'homme moustachu ('Kou')Tête de femmeTête de jeune filleTête de jeune fille au chapeau garni de raisinsTête IITricorne [Étude]Trois baigneusesTrois baigneuses, Juan-les-PinsTrois danseusesTrois nusVVase, pipe, paquet de tabacVerreVerre aux chalumeauxVerre d'absintheVerre de Pernod et cartesVerre et as de trèfle (Hommage à Max Jacob)Verre et bouteille de BassVerre et bouteille de rhum empailléeVerre et bouteille de SuzeVerre et déVerre et demijohnVerre et paquet de tabac sur une tableVerre et pipeVerre et pommeVerre et pomme sur une tableVerre sur un guéridonVerre sur une tableVerre, as de trèfle et déVerre, as de trèfle, bouteille sur une tableVerre, bouquet, guitare, bouteilleVerre, bouteille de Bass, as de trèfleVerre, bouteille de vin, paquet de tabac, journalVerre, dé et journalVerre, dé, journalVerre, guitare, bouteilleVerre, journal et déVerre, journal, bouteilleVerres et bouteillesViolinisteViolon 'Jolie Eva'Violon (4)Violon accroché au mur (Violin Hanging on the Wall)Violon au café (Violon, verre, bouteille)Violon de CéretViolon et bouteille sur une tableViolon et clarinetteViolon et feuille de musiqueViolon et guitareViolon et raisinsViolon et verres sur une tableViolon pyramidalViolon verticalViolon, partition et journalVisage de femmeVive la FranceVue sur le monument de Colomb''

1911-20
Picasso 1911-1920
1910s in art